Highlights is the second album by Tom Hingley and the Lovers, who feature Inspiral Carpets singer Tom Hingley, Steve Hanley and Paul Hanley from Manchester band The Fall, Jason Brown and Kelly Wood. It was released in 2008.

Track listing 
All Songs written by J. Brown, P. Hanley, S. Hanley, T. Hingley, K. Wood. 
"Kick out the Clocks"   
"All of my Time"   
"Let Go"  
"No Easy Exit" 
"Venomous"
"3AM"
Highlights
"I was Wrong"
"Both"
"Time is the Thief"
"Evergreen"
"Open up your Eyes"

Personnel
Tom Hingley and the Lovers
Tom Hingley - vocals
Steve Hanley - bass
Paul Hanley - drums, backing vocals
Jason Brown - lead Guitar, backing vocals
Kelly Wood - keyboards, piano, backing vocals
Guest musicians
Denise Johnson - backing vocals (Tracks 1 & 10) 
Sam Morris - French horn (Track 8)
Fabien Ferryman - backing vocals (Track 12)

External links
The Lovers Official site
The Lovers at Myspace

2008 albums
Tom Hingley and the Lovers albums